Death of Innocence is the first album by the American punk rock band Legal Weapon. It was independently released in 1982 on Arsenal Records.

Critical reception
Trouser Press wrote that "Death of Innocence catapulted Legal Weapon into greatness, and is one of the [1980]’s most underrated punk albums."

Track listing
All songs written by Kat Arthur and Brian Hansen, except "Waiting in Line" by Kat Arthur and Charlie Vartanian.

Personnel
Legal Weapon
Frank Agnew – guitar
Kat Arthur – vocals
Brian Hansen – guitar, vocals
Steve Soto – bass guitar
Charlie Vartanian – drums

Additional musicians and production
Ed Colver – photography
Eddie Dwayne – additional vocals
Adam Maples – additional vocals, percussion
Dan Vargas – cabasa, claps
Thom Wilson – production

References

1982 debut albums
Albums produced by Thom Wilson
Legal Weapon albums
Triple X Records albums